The 2019 Queensland Handball League was a Brisbane based championship for Handball.

The University Competition is the only competition currently finished. This was played during the National Championships on the Gold Coast. The University of Queensland won over University of the Sunshine Coast. Bond University was third.

The school tournament was played in October. The Senior Boys division was won by Cavendish Road State High School. Junior boys was won by Redlands College. The Junior & Senior girls tournament was merged. The winner was Brisbane State High School.

Opens Championship

Round 1

Round 2

Finals

Gold medal match

Bronze medal match

University Competition

Pool games

Final

Queensland All Schools Championship

Senior Boys
1. Cavendish Road State High School
2. Redeemer Lutheran College
3. Brisbane State High 1
4. Brisbane State High 2

Junior Boys
1. Redlands College
2. Brisbane State High School
3. Cavendish Road State High School

Senior Girls
1. Brisbane State High School
2. United Brisbane Schools
3. Cavendish Road State High School

Brisbane Junior Competition

Term 3 Competition

Bronze Medal match

Gold Medal match

References

External links
 Handball Queensland webpage

Handball competitions in Australia
2019 in Australian sport
2019 in handball
2019–20 domestic handball leagues